Vishwakalawa Grama Niladhari Division is a  Grama Niladhari Division of the  Kesbewa Divisional Secretariat  of Colombo District  of Western Province, Sri Lanka .  It has Grama Niladhari Division Code 574B.

Piliyandala Clock Tower  are located within, nearby or associated with Vishwakalawa.

Vishwakalawa is a surrounded by the  Mampe East, Mampe North and Mampe West  Grama Niladhari Divisions.

Demographics

Ethnicity 

The Vishwakalawa Grama Niladhari Division has  a Sinhalese majority (98.2%) . In comparison, the Kesbewa Divisional Secretariat (which contains the Vishwakalawa Grama Niladhari Division) has  a Sinhalese majority (97.3%)

Religion 

The Vishwakalawa Grama Niladhari Division has  a Buddhist majority (97.2%) . In comparison, the Kesbewa Divisional Secretariat (which contains the Vishwakalawa Grama Niladhari Division) has  a Buddhist majority (93.0%)

Gallery

References 

Grama Niladhari Divisions of Kesbewa Divisional Secretariat